Baldur is a Norse and Icelandic name, meaning "prince." Baldr is also a god in Norse mythology associated with light, beauty, love and happiness.

Variants
Balder Norse
Baldr Norse 
Baldur Norse, Icelandic

People with the given name
Baldur Ingimar Aðalsteinsson (born 1980), Icelandic football (soccer) player
 Baldur Bett (born 1980), Icelandic football (soccer) player
Baldur Þór Bjarnason (born 1969), Icelandic football (soccer) player
Baldur Bragason (born 1968), Icelandic football (soccer) player
Baldur Brönnimann (born 1968), Swiss music conductor
Baldur Hönlinger (1905–1990), Austrian chess master 
Baldur Möller (1914–1999), Icelandic chess master
 Baldur Preiml (born 1939), Austrian ski jumper
Baldur Ragnarsson (1930–2018), Icelandic poet and author of Esperanto works
 Baldur von Schirach (1907–1974), German politician and Nazi war criminal
 Baldur Sigurðsson (born 1985),  Icelandic football (soccer) player
 Baldur R. Stefansson (1917–2002), Canadian agricultural scientist

Notes

See also
Baldur (disambiguation)
Balder (disambiguation)

Masculine given names
Danish masculine given names
German masculine given names
Icelandic masculine given names
Norwegian masculine given names
Scandinavian masculine given names
Swedish masculine given names